Patrick Landau (5 September 1945 – 3 October 2007) was a tennis player from Monaco. During his career, Landau competed at Roland Garros and at the Davis Cup.

Early life and family 
Landau's paternal aunt was the Russian ballet dancer Alice Nikitina.

Career 
Landau studied at Brigham Young University, where he trained at the BYU Cougars.

Landau competed in the Davis Cup during several years between 1966 and 1972.

He also played in Roland Garros versus Zdravko Mincek.

References 

1945 births
2007 deaths
Monegasque male tennis players
BYU Cougars men's tennis players